The Borough Baronetcy, of Coolock Park (sometimes Coolock Lodge, Raheny) in the County of Dublin, was a title in the Baronetage of the United Kingdom. It was created on 13 November 1813 for Richard Borough. The title became extinct on the death of the second Baronet in 1879.

Borough baronets, of Coolock Park (1813)

Sir Richard Borough, 1st Baronet (1756–1837) son of Richard Borough and Dorothy Jones and husband of Anna Maria Lake (daughter of Gerard Lake, 1st Viscount Lake). Issue included Amabel Elizabeth Borough, Countess of Pomfret who married Thomas Fermor, 4th Earl of Pomfret and Augusta Borough who married Sir John Henry Fludyer, 4th Baronet
Sir Edward Richard Borough, 2nd Baronet (1800–1879) married Elizabeth St.Lawrence daughter of William St Lawrence, 2nd Earl of Howth. They resided at Glenaveena house on the south eastern slopes of Howth Head. He was Sheriff of Dublin City in 1841. Issue included Augusta Frances Borough who married Sir Arthur John Fludyer, 5th Baronet (Born 12 October 1844)

See also
Sheriff of Dublin City

References

Extinct baronetcies in the Baronetage of the United Kingdom
Borough family